Ambrose Dixon (1619 – April 12, 1687) was an early American Quaker pioneer who was born in England and emigrated to America at an early age where he lived in the Virginia Colony before moving to Maryland.

Dixon married Mary, the widow of Henry Peddington, between July 4, and October 28, 1647. It has been stated that her maiden name was Wilson.

In 1651, Dixon joined Colonel Edmund Scarburgh and others in riding against the Indians in defiance of the law. A Court Order of 10 May 1651 says:

He was a Quaker and had moved to Somerset Co., Maryland by January 4, 1663, to escape religious persecution. His home became the first Quaker meeting house in Maryland.

On January 4, 1666, he was appointed Surveyor for Highways. He was elected on March 3, 1671, he was elected a delegate in the Maryland Assembly representing Annemessex County, Maryland. He never attended.

He died in 1687 at his plantation, Dixon's Choice. He is the immigrant ancestor to thousands of Americans including the Indiana blacksmith Noah Beauchamp who murdered his neighbor in the 1840s.

References

External links
 Ambrose Dixon: The Man and the Legacy
 Ambrose Dixon Information
 Ambrose Dixon's Will
 Ambrose Dixon Society

1619 births
1687 deaths
American Quakers
English emigrants
Converts to Quakerism
17th-century Quakers
People of colonial Maryland
Virginia colonial people